Fools is the first single from Alphaville's fourth album Prostitute, and their fourteenth single overall. It was released in July 1994. "Fools" is the last Alphaville single to chart in any country until "I Die for You Today" (2011).

Track listings
 CD Maxi Single
 "Fools (Album Version)" - 3:54
 "Fools (Seven Seals)" - 3:59
 "Fools (Faithful & True)" - 4:16
 "Fools (Twelve Inch)" - 5:45

 CD Single Promo
 "Fools (7 inch)" - 3:53
 "Fools (12 inch)" - 5:44

 CD Single Promo Digipack
 "Fools (Seven Seals)" - 3:59
 "Fools (Faithful & True)" - 4:16

 12" Maxi Single Vinyl
 "Fools (Twelve Inch)" - 5:12
 "Fools" - 3:57
 "Fools (Instrumental)" - 5:13

 12" German DJ Promotional Single
 "Fools (12 Inch Berlin)" - 6:39
 "Fools (12 Inch London)" - 5:11
 "Fools (Seven Seals)" - 3:58
 "Fools (7 Inch)" - 3:52

 This is the first single from Alphaville (barring re-releases) that did not include an original B-side track
 The "7 Inch" mix is the same as the album version
 The CD Single Promo has a black colour cover with red fangs, and not a red colour cover with white fangs as the official CD Maxi Single and the CD Single Promo Digipack has.

Other releases
The "Faithful & True" and "12 Inch Berlin" remixes appeared again later on the Dreamscapes release, where the Berlin remix was re-labeled as the "Speed" remix.

Charts

References

1994 singles
Alphaville (band) songs
Songs written by Marian Gold
Warner Music Group singles
Songs written by Ricky Echolette
Songs written by Bernhard Lloyd
1994 songs